Jana Beckmann (born 2 May 1983) is a German shooter. She represented her country at the 2016 Summer Olympics in women's trap. She finished 19th in the qualification round and did not advance to the semifinals.

References

External links 
 
 
 
 
 

1983 births
Living people
German female sport shooters
Shooters at the 2016 Summer Olympics
Olympic shooters of Germany
Universiade medalists in shooting
Universiade gold medalists for Germany
European Games competitors for Germany
Shooters at the 2015 European Games
Medalists at the 2011 Summer Universiade
21st-century German women